Sweethead is the debut album by rock group Sweethead on November 2, 2009 following the release of their EP The Great Disruptors in July of the same year. The album was produced by guitarist Troy Van Leeuwen. The only track to be featured from the EP was The Great Disruptors.

Track listing

Personnel

Sweethead
Serrina Sims – vocals
Troy Van Leeuwen –  guitar, backing vocals, keyboards, bass
Eddie Nappi – bass
Norm Block – drums

Production personnel
Troy Van Leeuwen – production, mixing, engineering  
Norm Block – engineering
Max Allyn – engineering
Billy Howerdel – engineering
Justin Smith – engineering
Alain Johannes – mastering

References

2009 debut albums
Sweethead albums